Mix Tape is The Felice Brothers' seventh album. It is a limited release on the New York Pro label. It was released on March 30, 2010.

Track listing
"Forever Green" - 3:01
"Ahab" - 4:03
"White Limo" - 2:46
"Let Me Come Home" - 3:56
"The Captain's Wife" - 3:18
"Indian Massacre" - 4:18
"Old Song" - 2:49
"Marie" - 2:56
"Marlboro Man" - 5:44

The Felice Brothers albums
2010 albums